Gerezani is an administrative ward in the Ilala District of the Dar es Salaam Region of Tanzania. According to the 2012 census, the ward has a total population of 7,276.

References

Ilala District
Wards of Dar es Salaam Region